The Leverhulme Medal and Prize is awarded by the British Academy every three years 'for a significant contribution to knowledge and understanding in a field within the humanities and social sciences'. It was first awarded in 2002 and is funded by the Leverhulme Trust.

List of recipients

See also
 Awards of the British Academy
 List of social sciences awards

References

British Academy
British awards
Academic awards